Microtralia insularis is a species of minute air-breathing land snail, a marine pulmonate gastropod mollusc in the family Ellobiidae.

In Powell, 1979, this species was referred to as Rangitotoa insularis. However, the genus Rangitotoa is now considered to be an invalid synonym of Microtralia, and Rangitotoa insularis an invalid synonym of Microtralia occidentalis. The latter name is considered by some sources to be an invalid synonym of Microtralia ovulum (sometimes spelled Microtralia ovula), while other sources treat all three nominal species, including Microtralia insularis, as valid. There does not appear to be any published reason to doubt Climo's (1982) synonymies.

References

 Powell A. W. B., New Zealand Mollusca, William Collins Publishers Ltd, Auckland, New Zealand 1979 
 Type descriptions of the genus and species here: 

Ellobiidae
Gastropods of New Zealand
Gastropods described in 1933
Taxa named by Arthur William Baden Powell
Endemic fauna of New Zealand
Endemic molluscs of New Zealand